Hagaman, formerly Hagamans Mills, is a village in Montgomery County, New York, United States. The population was 1,292 at the 2010 census. It is named after Joseph Hagaman, the founding father.

The Village of Hagaman is in the Town of Amsterdam, northeast of the City of Amsterdam.

History

The community was formerly called Hagamans Mills. It was founded circa 1777.  Village offices are located in the historic Pawling Hall, listed on the National Register of Historic Places in 2002.

Current leadership
The Village of Hagaman currently has Robert Tom Krom as the mayor, with several other trustees serving as a legislature.

Geography
Hagaman is located at  (42.977531, -74.150493).

Demographics

At the 2000 census there were 1,357 people, 557 households, and 374 families living in the village. The population density was 880.3 people per square mile (340.2/km). There were 582 housing units at an average density of 377.5 per square mile (145.9/km). The racial makeup of the village was 97.79% White, 0.44% African American, 0.52% Asian, 0.44% from other races, and 0.81% from two or more races. Hispanic or Latino of any race were 2.21%.

Of the 557 households 26.4% had children under the age of 18 living with them, 54.4% were married couples living together, 9.7% had a female householder with no husband present, and 32.7% were non-families. 29.1% of households were one person and 15.1% were one person aged 65 or older. The average household size was 2.41 and the average family size was 2.94.

The age distribution was 22.0% under the age of 18, 7.1% from 18 to 24, 25.6% from 25 to 44, 27.3% from 45 to 64, and 17.9% 65 or older. The median age was 42 years. For every 100 females, there were 99.3 males. For every 100 females age 18 and over, there were 93.1 males.

The median household income was $41,875 and the median family income  was $52,500. Males had a median income of $32,463 versus $25,319 for females. The per capita income for the village was $19,527. About 3.8% of families and 6.7% of the population were below the poverty line, including 7.2% of those under age 18 and 13.6% of those age 65 or over.

References

External links
 Village of Hagaman, NY

Villages in New York (state)
Villages in Montgomery County, New York